Ann Turner (born 1960 in Adelaide) is an Australian writer and director of films and TV.

Select Credits
Celia (1989)
Hammers Over the Anvil (1992)
Turtle Beach (1992) - writer only
Dallas Doll (1994)
Irresistible (2006)

References

External links

1960 births
Living people
Australian film directors
Australian women film directors
Australian screenwriters
People from Adelaide